Ardscoil Rís may refer to:
Ardscoil Rís, Dublin, a boys' secondary school in Dublin
Ardscoil Rís, Limerick,  a boys' secondary school in Limerick